Wang Fang (born 29 July 1977) is a Chinese former synchronized swimmer who competed in the 2000 Summer Olympics. She has also been a coach on the Chinese national team since 2014.

After her retirement in 2001, Wang Fang returned to her hometown Nanjing where she trained a few local children in Xuanwu District. Among them were Gu Xiao and Guo Li, then only 9 years old, and Wang Fang coached them all the way from the district youth team to the senior national team. Liang Xinping (a year younger than Gu Xiao and Guo Li) also came under her wing at the age of 12. The trio were on Wang Fang's national team, who won silver at the 2016 Summer Olympics.

References

1977 births
Living people
Chinese synchronized swimmers
Olympic synchronized swimmers of China
Synchronized swimmers at the 2000 Summer Olympics
Sportspeople from Nanjing
Synchronized swimmers from Jiangsu
Nanjing Sport Institute alumni
Synchronized swimming coaches